Barbara Gracey Thompson MBE (27 July 1944 – 9 July 2022) was an English jazz saxophonist, flautist and composer. She studied clarinet, flute, piano  and classical composition at the Royal College of Music, but the music of Duke Ellington and John Coltrane made her shift her interests to jazz and saxophone. She was married to drummer Jon Hiseman of Colosseum from 1967 until his death in 2018.

Career
Around 1970, Thompson was part of Neil Ardley's New Jazz Orchestra and appeared on albums by Colosseum. Beginning in 1975, she was involved in the foundation of three bands:
United Jazz and Rock Ensemble, a "band of bandleaders" with Wolfgang Dauner (p), Volker Kriegel (g), Albert Mangelsdorff (tb), Eberhard Weber (b), Ian Carr (tp), Charlie Mariano (sax), Ack van Rooyen (tp) and Jon Hiseman (dr).
Barbara Thompson's Jubiaba (9-piece Latin/rock band) including Peter Lemer, Roy Babbington, Henry Lowther, Ian Hamer, Derek Wadsworth, Trevor Tomkins, Bill Le Sage, Glyn Thomas.
Barbara Thompson's Paraphernalia, a band with Peter Lemer (p), Billy Thompson (v), Dave Ball (b) and Jon Hiseman on drums.

She was awarded the MBE in 1996 for services to music. Due to Parkinson's disease, which was diagnosed in 1997, she retired as an active saxophonist in 2001 with a farewell tour. After a period of working as a composer exclusively, she returned to the stage in 2003 for a tour with Colosseum.

After she was hospitalised with atrial fibrillation, her attendance in an accident and emergency department was featured in an episode of the Channel 4 fly-on-the-wall television documentary 24 Hours in A&E in October 2020.

Thompson worked closely with Andrew Lloyd Webber on musicals such as Cats and Starlight Express, his Requiem, and Lloyd Webber's 1978 classical-fusion album Variations. She wrote several classical compositions, music for film and television, a musical of her own and songs for the United Jazz and Rock Ensemble, Barbara Thompson's Paraphernalia and her big band Moving Parts.  She was a regular, along with her husband drummer Jon Hiseman and bassist David "Dill" Katz in the underground "Cellar Bar" at South Hill Park Arts Centre in Bracknell during the late 1970s and 1980s.

She played the incidental music in the ITV police series A Touch of Frost, starring David Jason.  She also played flute on Jeff Wayne's Musical Version of The War of the Worlds.

Personal life
Thompson was married to Colosseum drummer Jon Hiseman, from 1967 until his death in June 2018. The couple's son Marcus was born in 1972, and their daughter Anna (now known as singer/songwriter Ana Gracey) in 1975.

Thompson died on 9 July 2022, aged 77, after having Parkinson's disease for 25 years.

Discography

References

External links 
 Official site
 
 

1944 births
2022 deaths
20th-century English women musicians
21st-century English women musicians
21st-century saxophonists
Alumni of the Royal College of Music
Colosseum (band) members
Deaths from Parkinson's disease
English jazz composers
English jazz flautists
English jazz saxophonists
Members of the Order of the British Empire
Musicians from Oxford
New Jazz Orchestra members
People from Finchley
United Jazz + Rock Ensemble members
Women jazz saxophonists
20th-century flautists
21st-century flautists